The Juggler of Notre Dame is the English-language title of the following works:

Le Jongleur de Notre Dame, story by French writer Anatole France; published in 1892
Le jongleur de Notre-Dame, opera by French composer Jules Massenet; first performed in 1902

See also
Other literary, film and video versions of the same story as detailed in the entry Le Jongleur de Notre Dame